A brace is a hand tool used with a bit (drill bit or auger) to drill holes, usually in wood. Pressure is applied to the top and the tool is rotated with a U-shaped grip. Bits used to come in a variety of types but the more commonly used Ridgeway- and Irwin- pattern bits also rely on a snail point (called the snail), which is a tapered screw point shaped the same as a wood screw thread, which helps to pull the bit into the wood as the user turns the brace handle and applies pressure

The U-shaped part is a kind of crank. It gives the brace much greater torque than other kinds of hand-powered drills. A brace and bit can be used to drill much wider and deeper holes than can a geared  hand-powered drill. The price of the greater torque is lower rotational speed; it is easy for a geared hand drill to achieve a rotational speed of several hundred revolutions per minute, but it requires considerable effort to achieve even 100 rpm with a brace.

The front part of the brace consists of a chuck spindle with V-shaped brackets or clamps inside. Turning the spindle of the chuck in a clockwise direction tightens the drill bit in the chuck and turning in a counter-clockwise direction loosens the bit for removal.

In most modern braces, immediately behind the chuck is a three position gear release which allows ratcheting of the handle when in tight spots. Turning the gear release from the center position allows ratcheting the brace in the direction needed. Turning the gear release fully clockwise lets it remove wood in a clockwise direction with the ratchet action going counter-clockwise. Placing the gear release fully counter-clockwise then allows turning the brace and bit in a counter-clockwise direction, usually to remove the drill bit from the hole. The center position of the gear release prohibits the ratcheting effect.

The U-shaped crank has a wooden spindle on it and—along with the top spindle—is allowed to freely turn under the hands without producing wear and tear on the hands (thus, no blisters).

The earliest carpenter's braces equipped with a U-shaped grip, that is with a compound crank, appeared between 1420 and 1430 in Flanders.

The brace has other names. Bit brace is the most commonly used name, but Carpenter's brace, ratchet brace (if indeed a ratchet mechanism is part of the particular brace) and swing brace are also commonly used too.

See also
Hand drills for some related tools, including the type sometimes known as a wheel brace.

References

Bibliography 
 Adamson, John, "The Ultimatum brace: a feat of engineering", Furniture & Cabinetmaking, issue 264, December 2017, pp. 52–5
 Eaton, Reg (1989). The Ultimate Brace: A Unique Product of Victorian Sheffield. King's Lynn: Erica Jane Publishing  
 Russell, David R., with Robert Lesage and photographs by James Austin, cataloguing assisted by Peter Hackett (2010). Antique Woodworking Tools: Their Craftsmanship from the Earliest Times to the Twentieth Century  Cambridge: John Adamson , "Boring tools: drills and braces", pp. 459–90

Hole making
Mechanical hand tools
Woodworking hand tools